Matej Oravec (born 30 March 1998) is a Slovak professional footballer who plays as a centre-back and defensive midfielder for Slovak Fortuna Liga club Železiarne Podbrezová.

Club career

Spartak Trnava
Oravec made his professional Fortuna Liga debut for Spartak Trnava against Podbrezová on 17 July 2016.

Philadelphia Union
On 20 January 2020, Oravec moved to MLS side Philadelphia Union. 

He was loaned to Železiarne Podbrezová in July 2021.  Philadelphia Union and Oravec mutually agree to part ways on 7 July 2022.

Honours 
Spartak Trnava
 Fortuna Liga: 2017–18

References

External links
 FC Spartak Trnava official club profile
 
 Futbalnet profile

1998 births
Living people
Sportspeople from Trnava
Slovak footballers
Slovak expatriate footballers
Slovakia youth international footballers
Slovakia under-21 international footballers
Association football defenders
FC Spartak Trnava players
FK Železiarne Podbrezová players
FC DAC 1904 Dunajská Streda players
Philadelphia Union players
Slovak Super Liga players
2. Liga (Slovakia) players
Expatriate soccer players in the United States
Slovak expatriate sportspeople in the United States